Tobias "Toby" Hampson (born December 20, 1975) is an attorney and judge of the North Carolina Court of Appeals.

Hampson graduated from the North Carolina School of Science and Mathematics and earned an undergraduate degree in international studies and history from American University in 1998. He earned his Juris Doctor degree from the Norman Adrian Wiggins School of Law in 2002. He worked as a law clerk to judges K. Edward Greene, Wanda Bryant and Robert C. Hunter of the North Carolina Court of Appeals from 2002 to 2004, as an attorney at Patterson Dilthey from 2004 to 2007, and at Wyrick, Robbins, Yates & Ponton from 2007 to 2018.

In 2018, Hampson was elected to an eight-year term on the North Carolina Court of Appeals (expiring 2026). He took office in January 2019.

References

1975 births
Living people
21st-century American judges
American University alumni
Campbell University alumni
North Carolina Court of Appeals judges
North Carolina Democrats